is a Japanese politician of the Democratic Party of Japan, a former member of the House of Councillors in the Diet (national legislature). A native of Kawaguchi, Saitama and graduate of Waseda University, he worked at the Fuji Bank (now part of Mizuho Financial Group) from 1987 until 2003 when he ran unsuccessfully for the House of Representatives. In 2004, he was elected to the House of Councillors for the first time.

References

External links 
  in Japanese.

Members of the House of Councillors (Japan)
Living people
1964 births
People from Kawaguchi, Saitama
Waseda University alumni
Democratic Party of Japan politicians